Mills Peak is a peak  southwest of Cape Douglas, rising to  in the northern portion of Barff Peninsula, South Georgia.

It was named by the UK Antarctic Place-Names Committee in 1988 for Lieutenant Keith Mills, commander of the Royal Marines platoon at King Edward Point at the Battle of Grytviken between the United Kingdom and Argentina, April 3, 1982.

References

Mountains and hills of South Georgia